Particle mass analyser is a measurement technique for classifying aerosol particles according to their mass-to-charge ratio.

Techniques exist for classifying (selecting) aerosol particles in the sub 1,000 nm range according to electrical mobility using devices such as differential mobility analysers.

Electrical mobility
In electrical mobility measurement, aerosol particles are classified according to their aerodynamic drag-charge ratio. If the particle is non-spherical, the electrical-mobility diameter will not correspond to any measurable physical dimensions of the particle. (For a spherical particle, the electrical-mobility diameter will correspond to physically measurable diameter.)

Centrifugal particle mass analyzer
An alternative technique classifies particles according to their mass-to-charge ratio, using opposing electrical and centrifugal forces. This allows the classifier to select particles of a specified mass-to-charge ratio independent of particle shape. 

Further work on the technique used centrifugal and electrostatic forces to classify particles according to their mass-to-charge ratio.

References

Measuring instruments
Scientific instruments
Scientific techniques
Aerosol measurement